The Billie Jo Spears Singles Album is a compilation album by American country artist Billie Jo Spears. It was released in November 1979 via United Artists Records. Two versions of the album were issued with different track listings. A North American version with ten tracks and an international version with 14 tracks were both distributed. The international version charted on the UK Albums Chart and later certified gold from the British Phonographic Industry.

Background and content
Billie Jo Spears reached her career peak when she returned to United Artists Records in the 1970s. She had three top ten singles and one chart-topping single. Several more made the top 20 through the early eighties. Her first notable compilation album from the label was 1979's The Billie Jo Spears Singles Album. The disc featured popular singles by Spears originally recorded between 1974 and 1977.

Two versions of The Billie Jo Spears Singles Album were released for two different markets. The North American version consisted of ten tracks. The international version consisted of 14 tracks. The North American version contained Spears's most well-known singles in the United States and Canada. This included the number one song, "Blanket on the Ground", and her three top ten singles: "What I've Got in Mind", "Misty Blue" and "If You Want Me". The international version added several songs, including "Sing Me an Old Fashioned Song" (a popular recording in Ireland and the United Kingdom) and "Every Time I Sing a Love Song".

Release, reception and chart performance
The Billie Jo Spears Singles Album was released in November 1979 on United Artists Records. It was distributed as both a vinyl LP and as a cassette. It received positive reception following its release from Cashbox magazine. Reviewers called the disc "a sure winner for any country fan" and concluded that it was a "super album from a super singer". AllMusic rated the album 4.5 out of 5 possible stars. The album spent 17 weeks on the UK Albums Chart, peaking at number seven position. It was Spears's only top ten album in the United Kingdom.

Track listings

North American version

International version

Technical personnel
All credits are adapted from the liner notes of The Billie Jo Spears Singles Album.

 BilBo – Lacquer cut
 Paul Cemmick – Illustration
 Phil Jude – Photography
 Iain McClay – Compilied by
 John Pasche – Art direction
 Shoot That Tiger! – Design

Chart performance

Certifications

References

1979 compilation albums
Billie Jo Spears albums
United Artists Records compilation albums